In geometry, the small triambic icosahedron is a star polyhedron composed of 20 intersecting non-regular hexagon faces. It has 60 edges and 32 vertices, and Euler characteristic of −8. It is an isohedron, meaning that all of its faces are symmetric to each other. Branko Grünbaum has conjectured that it is the only Euclidean isohedron with convex faces of six or more sides, but the small hexagonal hexecontahedron is another example.

Geometry

The dihedral angle equals .

Related shapes
The external surface of the small triambic icosahedron (removing the parts of each hexagonal face that are surrounded by other faces, but interpreting the resulting disconnected plane figures as still being faces) coincides with one of the stellations of the icosahedron. If instead, after removing the surrounded parts of each face, each resulting triple of coplanar triangles is considered to be three separate faces, then the result is one form of the triakis icosahedron, formed by adding a triangular pyramid to each face of an icosahedron.

The dual polyhedron of the small triambic icosahedron is the small ditrigonal icosidodecahedron. As this is a uniform polyhedron, the small triambic icosahedron is a uniform dual. Other uniform duals whose exterior surfaces are stellations of the icosahedron are the medial triambic icosahedron and the great triambic icosahedron.

References

Further reading
  (p. 46, Model W26, triakis icosahedron)
  (pp. 42–46, dual to uniform polyhedron W70)
 H.S.M. Coxeter, Regular Polytopes, (3rd edition, 1973), Dover edition, 3.6 6.2 Stellating the Platonic solids, pp.96-104

External links 
 

Polyhedral stellation
Dual uniform polyhedra